Guanine nucleotide-binding protein subunit alpha-11 is a protein that in humans is encoded by the GNA11 gene. Together with GNAQ (its paralogue), it functions as a Gq alpha subunit.

See also
 Gq alpha subunit

References

Further reading